Cultural Critique is a quarterly peer-reviewed academic journal published across the fields of cultural studies, literary theory, political science, philosophy, and sociology. It was founded in 1985 and is published by the University of Minnesota Press. The journal is currently edited by John Mowitt, Cesare Casarino, Simona Sawhney and Maggie Hennefeld.

Abstracting and indexing
The journal is abstracted and indexed in the following bibliographic databases:

References

External links

English-language journals
Political science journals
Sociology journals
Cultural journals
Publications established in 1985
Quarterly journals